Theo Francken (born 7 February 1978) is a Belgian politician who has been a member of the Chamber of Representatives since 2010. He is a member of the New Flemish Alliance (N-VA), a conservative Flemish nationalist party. 

Francken was made state secretary for asylum and migration in the first Charles Michel cabinet in 2014, where he became prominent for his controversial zero tolerance approach to illegal immigration in the midst of the European migrant crisis. Francken and the N-VA opposed Belgium's support of the Global Compact for Migration, leading them to exit the coalition government in December 2018 and thereby trigger its collapse.

Political career 

Theo Francken does not hail from a political family. Neither of his parents were involved in politics. Theo Francken acquired his interest in politics during high school, were he became inspired by his history teachers instructing him on the struggle of Flemings to achieve cultural and linguistical rights within the Belgian state during the 19th and 20th centuries.  
After graduating from university, Francken became a scientific collaborator for N-VA at the Flemish parliament (2001 – 2004). From 2005 till 2008 he was councillor and from 2009 till 2010 deputy head of cabinet in with Flemish Vice-Minister-President Geert Bourgeois, focussing on issues such as integration policy. 
Theo Francken founded a local N-VA-branch in his native town Lubbeek, leading it to the ballot box in the municipal elections of 2006. However, with only 4.96% of the votes, N-VA did not manage to win any of the seats in the municipal council.

At the federal elections in 2010, Theo Francken was head of the list for the province of Vlaams-Brabant, campaigning on issues like asylum, migration and integration. Achieving 13,164 personal votes, he became elected in the Belgian Federal Parliament, the Kamer van volksvertegenwoordigers. Theo Francken was a very vocal new member of Parliament and strove to make Belgium's notoriously lax migration laws more strict, achieving a stricter legislation on family reunification  as well as a stricter procedure on the acquisition of the Belgian nationality.

At the municipal elections of 2012, he again lead N-VA to the polls in his native town Lubbeek.  Achieving 25.68% of the votes, N-VA became the biggest party and Theo Francken became mayor of Lubbeek in January 2013.

At the federal elections in 2014, Theo Francken achieved 44,489 votes and once again became elected in the Belgian Federal Parliament. Subsequently, he entered the government on 11 October 2014, as State Secretary for Asylum, Migration, and Administrative Simplification in the federal government Regering-Michel I.

During his time in office, Theo Francken enforced a series of administrative practices and legislative changes to enhance the return of illegal immigrants, achieving records in repatriating illegal immigrants jailed for criminal offences.  This policy made him the most popular politician in Belgium according to polls, despite vehement criticism from left leaning parties, above all in French-speaking Belgium, who have consistently been framing Theo Francken as an extreme-right politician ever since taking up office.

In his second year in office, 2015, Theo Francken was confronted with the European Migration Crisis, that brought a record of 44,660 asylum seekers to Belgium according to Eurostat data.  In order to fulfill Belgium's European obligation under the Reception Conditions Directive EU directive for the reception of asylum seekers, Theo Francken set out to double the reception capacity of Belgium in a matter of months, working closely together with then Minister of Defence Steven Vandeput, who put numerous army barracks at the disposal of Theo Francken to house new arrivals of asylum seekers.

During a meeting with fellow European Migration Ministers in the European Council of Ministers of May 2018, Theo Francken called the reform of the Dublin-regulation “dead" and instead put forward the idea that Europe needs an ‘Australian style’ border defence, meaning Europe needs to strike migration deals with third countries on the other side of the Mediterranean Sea, where illegal immigrants intercepted by European ships can be safely put ashore and sheltered in a humane fashion, whereby asylum migration to EU countries would be limited to legal humanitarian migration by means of national humanitarian visa.  However, Theo Francken was immediately rebuffed by EU Commissar Avramopoulos, who quickly issued a statement that Europe would never follow the Australian model of border protection. Theo Francken remained a very vocal advocate of zero tolerance to illegal immigration, calling Europe's migration model ‘inhumane’, and further elaborated these ideas in a bestselling book published in October 2018, bearing the title ‘Continent without borders’ (Continent zonder Grens).  
The end of 2018 also saw rising tensions within various EU Member States on the issue of United Nations Global Compact on Migration. The N-VA was staunchly opposed to the Migration Pact, leading to the fall of the government on 9 December 2018. Following the demise of the government, Theo Francken once again resumed his role as member in the Federal Parliament. In the following general elections, Theo Francken was re-elected member of the Federal Parliament, dwarfing his opponents by reaping 122,738 personal votes.

Controversy 

Theo Francken has been the subject of numerous controversies during his tenure as Secretary of State.
In October 2014 several the leftist political parties PS, PTB and FDF demanded Francken's and Ben Weyts' resignation after the two were present at the birthday of Bob Maes, a former member of the Vlaams Nationaal Verbond, a party who collaborated with the Nazis in the Second World War. The Christian democratic CD&V and CDH, the liberal MR and VLD, the green parties ECOLO and Groen! and the far-right Vlaams Belang party did not view the visit as problematic, since Bob Maes was a mere 19 years old when World War Two ended and was never convicted for collaboration with the Nazis.

In the same month Theo Francken also came in stormy waters after the leaking of some old mails with allegedly homophobic statements, which Theo Francken vehemently denied, and a Facebook post in where he questioned the "added value" that immigrants from Morocco, Congo and Algeria bring to the Belgian economy. Subsequently, Theo Francken apologised in the federal parliament.

In May 2017 Francken made several tweets accusing the NGO Médecins Sans Frontières of human trafficking in connection with their operation to transport to provide aid to illegal migrants picked up from rubber boats off the coast of Libya trying to reach the EU without entry visa.
In September 2017 a Sudanese delegation was invited to Brussels to identify undocumented immigrants that refused to apply for asylum in Belgium Cooperation with the Sudanese regime was already an issue, but controversy spiked in December of that year after two migrants who had returned allegedly reported being tortured upon arrival in Sudan. However, after due investigation by Belgium's independent Commissariat-General for Refugees and Stateless persons (CGRS), “no proof“ of the allegations of torture could be found.
Also in September, Francken had to apologise after using the hashtag #opkuisen, Dutch for "cleaning up", in a tweet about the arrest of illegal immigrants who had been camping at the North Station of Brussels and the adjacent Maximiliaanpark.

After the 2017 Catalan independence referendum Francken commented that Catalonians, including Carles Puigdemont, could ask for asylum in Belgium. The Prime Minister then asked the Secretary not to add fuel to the fire.

In January 2019, one month after his departure as Secretary of State for Asylum, Migration and Administrative Simplification, Francken was questioned as a witness by Belgian judicial authorities in connection with an investigation into possible fraud involving humanitarian visas by one of his closest aides. The suspect, Melikan Kucam, was one of  several external people entrusted to advise Francken's cabinet with regard to identifying Christian Syrian refugees from war affected regions in Syria that could be offered humanitarian visa from Belgium. Kucam was accused of asking money to put Syrian Christians on the list. However, he denied any such actions and was released from preliminary custody in October 2019. As of December, the investigation is still pending

Personal life 
Francken is married with two children and lives in Lubbeek. In 2014, Francken was the target of death threats from someone claiming to be an extremist Muslim along with fellow N-VA minister Jan Jambon. He received police protection as a result of the incident.

Notes

External links

1978 births
Living people
People from Flemish Brabant
New Flemish Alliance politicians
Members of the Chamber of Representatives (Belgium)
KU Leuven alumni
21st-century Belgian politicians
Mayors of places in Belgium
Political controversies in Belgium